K225BS (92.9 FM) is a radio station that broadcast local artists/bands from  Denver, Colorado operated by the Rocky Mountain Public Broadcasting Network, Inc. under the branding of "Denver Open Media". The station carried mainly locally originated content from local musical artists, and from a membership base of approximately 500 local individuals and organizations who used Denver Open Media equipment and facilities to produce and broadcast shows on radio and cable television. The station mainly served downtown Denver proper over-the-air.

History
On January 28, 2019, the parent organization of Denver Open Media, the Open Media Foundation requested the cancellation of its KOMF-LPFM license at 104.7FM. and Denver Open Media radio re-launched on 89.3HD3 and 92.9FM in partnership with KUVO

References

External links
 
 RadioSurvivor.com visits and tours KOMF-LP station in July 2016

OMF-LP
Radio stations established in 2016
Talk radio stations in the United States
OMF-LP
2016 establishments in Colorado